, better known as , is a Japanese screenwriter and novelist.

In 1991, he won the Ministry of Education, Culture, Sports, Science and Technology's Newcomer Award for his writing on the medical drama series . His gay-themed drama series , which aired on prime-time television in 1993, is considered a pioneering work for its depiction of gay relationships.

In the late 1990s, he was involved in a legal dispute with Igarashi over merchandising rights to Georgie!

References

External links
 Official blog 
 

1945 births
Living people